Israeli Song may refer to:

Israeli Song (album), an Eli Degibri recording
Music of Israel